John Victor Morais S.B.St.J also known as J. Victor Morais (1910–1991) was a Malaysian writer, journalist and managing director of several newspapers. He was also known as the editor and publisher of the biannual directory Who's Who in Malaysia and Singapore (and ), which was first published as The Leaders of Malaya and who's who in 1956. It was a successor of Who's Who in Malaya, which stopped to publish for about 30 years until the birth of Morais's Who's Who.

Biography
Morais was the publisher of The Perak Times in Ipoh, Perak and other location, during the Japanese occupation of Malaya. After the war, he worked for several newspaper, such as Malaya Tribune and [unknown location] Daily News.

Political career
In 1948, Morais was also appointed as an unofficial member of the Perak State Executive Council.

References

Malaysian editors
Malaysian journalists
Malaysian writers
Malaysian politicians
Serving Brothers of the Order of St John
1910 births
1991 deaths
20th-century journalists